The Saudi Arabia national under-16 basketball team is the national basketball team of the Kingdom of Saudi Arabia and is governed by the Saudi Arabian Basketball Federation.
It represents the country in international under-16 (under age 16) basketball competitions.

See also
Saudi Arabia men's national basketball team
Saudi Arabia men's national under-18 basketball team
Saudi Arabia national 3x3 team

References

Saudi Arabia national basketball team
Men's national under-16 basketball teams